The 2013 U.S. Men's Clay Court Championships was a men's tennis tournament played on outdoor clay courts. It was part of the 2013 ATP World Tour. It was the 45th edition of the U.S. Men's Clay Court Championships, and an ATP World Tour 250 event. It took place at River Oaks Country Club in Houston, Texas, United States, from April 8 through April 14, 2013. Fifth-seeded John Isner  won the singles title.

Singles main draw entrants

Seeds

Rankings and seedings are as of April 1, 2013.

Other entrants
The following players received wildcards into the main draw:
  Steve Johnson
  Jack Sock
  Rhyne Williams

The following players received entry via the qualifying draw:
  Facundo Argüello
  Robby Ginepri
  Bradley Klahn
  Gerald Melzer

The following player received entry as a lucky loser:
  Ivo Karlović

Withdrawals
Before the tournament
  Carlos Berlocq
  Leonardo Mayer
  Sam Querrey

Doubles main draw entrants

Seeds

 Rankings are as of April 1, 2013.

Other entrants
The following pairs received wildcards into the doubles main draw:
  Steve Johnson /  Jack Sock
  Fernando Verdasco /  Mischa Zverev

Finals

Singles

 John Isner defeated  Nicolás Almagro, 6–3, 7–5

Doubles

  Jamie Murray /  John Peers defeated  Bob Bryan /  Mike Bryan, 1–6, 7–6(7–3), [12–10]

References

External links

Official website

 
U.S. Men's Clay Court Championships
U.S. Men's Clay Court Championships
U.S. Men's Clay Court Championships
U.S. Men's Clay Court Championships